Vinko is a masculine name related to Vincent, and may refer to:

Given name
Frane Vinko Golem (1938–2007), Croatian diplomat and politician
Vinko Begović (born 1948), Croatian football coach
Vinko Bogataj (born 1950), former ski jumper from Slovenia
Vinko Brešan (born 1964), Croatian film director
Vinko Coce (1954–2013), Croatian singer
Vinko Dvořák (1848–1922), Czech-Croatian physicist, professor and rector of Zagreb University
Vinko Globokar (born 1934), avant-garde composer and trombonist of Slovene descent
Vinko Golob (1921–1995), Bosnian football player
Vinko Knežević (1755–1832), Austrian general of the Napoleonic Wars
Vinko Ošlak (born 1947), Slovene author, essayist, translator, columnist and esperantist from the Austrian state Carinthia
Vinko Pintarić (1941–1991), Croatian serial killer
Vinko Pribojević (born mid-15th century), Croatian historian, ideologue and founder of the pan-Slavic ideology
Vinko Puljić (born 1945), Bosnian Croat Cardinal of the Roman Catholic Church
Vinko Žganec (1890–1976), Croatian ethnomusicologist

Surname
Vedran Vinko (born 1990), Slovenian footballer

See also
Vinco (disambiguation)

Croatian masculine given names
Czech masculine given names
Slovene masculine given names